The Whitewater River is a river in Fiordland, New Zealand, flowing eastward into George Sound.

See also
List of rivers of New Zealand

References

Rivers of Fiordland